Pediasia figuratellus is a moth in the family Crambidae. It was described by Francis Walker in 1866. It is found in South Africa.

References

Endemic moths of South Africa
Crambini
Moths described in 1866
Moths of Africa